Alessandra Formica (born March 13, 1993) is an Italian basketball player for Virtus Eirene Ragusa Italy and the Italian national team.

She participated at the EuroBasket Women 2017.

References

1993 births
Living people
Italian women's basketball players
Centers (basketball)